Carol Shoshkes Reiss, an American viral immunologist, has been professor in New York University's department of biology since 1991.  Her research focused on the dynamic contest between the mouse immune system and virus replication during infection of the central nervous system. Reiss was editor-in-chief of the journal Viral Immunology (2000–2006) and is currently editor-in-chief of the journal DNA and Cell Biology (2012–present).

Biography
Reiss attended public schools in South Orange, New Jersey, before Bryn Mawr College (A.B. in biology, 1972), Sarah Lawrence College (M.S. in human genetics, 1973). She earned a Ph.D. in microbiology from Mount Sinai Graduate school of Biomedical Sciences (1978, then affiliated with City University of New York); her dissertation advisor was Jerome L. Schulman.

She was a postdoctoral research fellow of Steven J. Burakoff in the department of pathology at Harvard Medical School (1978–1981) and then an instructor, assistant professor and associate professor of pathology and pediatric oncology at Dana–Farber Cancer Institute (1981–1991). She joined New York University as a tenured full professor in 1991. In addition to the department of biology, she has faculty appointments in neural science in NYU's Faculty of Arts and Science, and in its College of Global Public Health.

Scientific work 
Her research at Mt. Sinai characterized the ability of killed, subunit and attenuated influenza virus to induce immune responses and protection from infectious challenge by homotypic and heterotypic influenza viruses. As a postdoctoral fellow, she explored the responses of helper T cell responses to influenza and mapped critical domains of class I Major Histocompatibility Complex molecules necessary for presenting viral peptides to cytolytic T cells.

In collaboration with Alice S. Huang, Reiss's lab studied viral encephalitis, the pathogenesis of Vesicular Stomatitis Virus (VSV) infection in the central nervous system and recognition of viral proteins. The role and molecular mechanisms by which cytokines altered the course of infection was studied both in vitro and in vivo. These studies determined that the antiviral response of neurons to cytokines (interferons-b and -g, IL-12, and TNF-a) was profoundly different from cells of other origins. The lab also examined the impact of administration of cytokines, and common drugs that modulated prostaglandins, leukotrienes, and cannabinoids impacted the disease pathogenesis. Other studies developed a vector capable of either being a flexible vaccine platform or effective for killing tumor cells.

Professional activities 

Reiss organized international Keystone Symposia "Molecular Aspects of Viral Immunology "(1990–2001) with several co-organizers, and NeuroImmunology conferences at the  New York Academy of Sciences (2004–2006). She was the principal co-organizer of the March for Science NYC in 2018.   

Reiss was elected a Fellow of the New York Academy of Sciences in 2005.

She was also the co-Principal Investigator and co-Director of the NYU Science Training Enhancement Program (one of the seventeen NIH BEST programs) for 1200 doctoral students and postdoctoral fellows (2013–2018). She coordinates science faculty advisors for students at Tisch School of the Arts who are writing screenplays that compete for support by the Alfred P. Sloan Foundation.

Selected publications  
Reiss published more than 88 peer reviewed papers, and two editions of the book Neurotropic Viral Infections.

Sex differences in autoimmune disease, CC Whitacre, Nature immunology 2 (9), 777–780	1879*	2001
Ia expression by vascular endothelium is inducible by activated T cells and by human gamma interferon. JS Pober, MA Gimbrone Jr, RS Cotran, CS Reiss, SJ Burakoff, W Fiers, The Journal of experimental medicine 157 (4), 1339–1353, 767, 1983
Lymphocytes recognize human vascular endothelial and dermal fibroblast Ia antigens induced by recombinant immune interferon, JS Pober, T Collins, MA Gimbrone, RS Cotran, JD Gitlin, W Fiers, Nature 305 (5936), 726–729, 533, 1983
Long-term human cytolytic T-cell lines allospecific for HLA-DR6 antigen are OKT4+, AM Krensky, CS Reiss, JW Mier, JL Strominger, SJ Burakoff, Proceedings of the National Academy of Sciences 79 (7), 2365–2369, 322, 1982
Inducible expression of class II major histocompatibility complex antigens and the immunogenicity of vascular endothelium, JS Pober, T Collins, MA Gimbrone Jr, P Libby, CS Reiss, Transplantation 41 (2), 141–146	249, 1986
Does nitric oxide play a critical role in viral infections?, CS Reiss, T Komatsu, Journal of Virology 72 (6), 4547-4551

References

External links 
 

Living people
New York University faculty
Year of birth missing (living people)
American immunologists
Women immunologists
Academic journal editors
American virologists
Women virologists
Bryn Mawr College alumni
Sarah Lawrence College alumni
Place of birth missing (living people)